Soroksky Uyezd (pre-reform ) was one of the subdivisions of the Bessarabia Governorate of the Russian Empire. It was situated in the northern part of the governorate. Its administrative centre was Soroca.

Soroksky Uyezd was created in 1836 alongside Beletsky Uyezd from Yassky Uyezd which then ceased to exist. In 1918, after the October Revolution, the uyezd became part of the Kingdom of Romania until 1944, when Moldavian SSR was created as a result of Eastern Front land exchanges between the Soviets and the Nazis. Finally, in 1949, the "uyezd" territorial subdivision was abolished and three new raions (districts) were created, one of which retained the name as Raion Soroca.

Demographics
At the time of the Russian Empire Census of 1897, Soroksky Uyezd had a population of 218,861. Of these, 63.2% spoke Romanian, 16.0% Ukrainian, 14.2% Yiddish, 4.8% Russian, 0.8% Polish, 0.5% German, 0.2% Romani and 0.1% Armenian as their native language.

References

 
Uezds of Bessarabia Governorate
Bessarabia Governorate